Saimi Hoyer (née Nousiainen, born 18 June 1974, Helsinki) is a Finnish model and television personality. Her unique look helped her become one of the most successful models in Finland.

Life
She was born in 1974. Her parents were actors Soila Komi and Jyrki Nousiainen.

Before modeling, Hoyer studied at Sibelius Academy. After this, she studied Hungarian, Italian and literature at the University of Jyväskylä. Her modeling career began when a photographer "discovered" her at a concert while she was on exchange in Firenze, Italy studying theatre. Hoyer got to walk the catwalk in Milan, Paris, London, New York City and Tokyo and worked for Diesel and Burberry. Her photos have been seen in Italy and featured on the pages of US Vogue and Marie Claire.

Hoyer retired from modeling in 2003 and became an editor for Image magazine and a columnist for the magazine MeNaiset. She has also written columns for Savon Sanomat and has been a weather reporter for Nelonen. She currently writes articles for the magazine Anna.

In 2005, Hoyer hosted the MTV3 show Mallikoulu 2005 where she taught promising models how to walk on the runway. In 2006, she did the MTV3 style show Unisex, along with Arman Alizad and Heli Roiha. In one episode, she criticised the Jokapoika collection by Marimekko as being old-fashioned. Marimekko CEO Kirsti Paakkanen gave a statement, which was later withdrawn.

Hoyer married financial director Thomas Hoyer in October 2006. They had their first child, Kaspar Thor Ever the same year in November and Hektor in 2009. She is one of the judges in the Finnish version of America's Next Top Model, Suomen huippumalli haussa, which started in spring 2008. Hoyer was divorced from her husband in 2018.

References

External links
 Saimi Nousiainen on MTV3

Finnish female models
Finnish television presenters
1974 births
Mass media people from Helsinki
Living people
Finnish women television presenters